Lars-Kristian "Lasse" Eriksen (born 28 June 1983) is a Norwegian former footballer who last played for Odd in the Norwegian top division. Eriksen has played 19 games for Norway U21 national football team.

He started his career with Norwegian side Aalesunds FK, but transferred to Lyn in 2002. He came through the Lyn youth system, having attended the Norwegian College of Elite Sport. After the 2008 campaign he left Lyn to join Lillestrøm SK. Autumn 2011 he signed for Odd Grenland, binding him to the club from 1 January 2012.

He is a member of the Christian sports organization Kristen Idrettskontakt (KRIK).

Career statistics 
Source:

Personal life
Lars-Kristian Eriksen is married to journalist and blogger Caroline Berg Eriksen.

References

1983 births
Living people
Sportspeople from Ålesund
Norwegian footballers
Norwegian Christians
Lyn Fotball players
Lillestrøm SK players
Odds BK players
Eliteserien players
Association football defenders